Alexander McDonnell (1798–1835), sometimes spelled MacDonnell, was an Irish chess master, who contested a series of six matches with the world's leading chess player Louis-Charles Mahé de La Bourdonnais in 1834.

Early life 
The son of a surgeon, Alexander McDonnell was born in Belfast in 1798. He was trained as a merchant and worked for some time in the West Indies. In 1820, he settled in London, where he became the secretary of the Committee of West Indian Merchants in which role he advocated strongly on behalf of slave-owning sugar plantation owners. It was a lucrative post that made him a wealthy man and left him with plenty of time to indulge his passion for chess.  In his politics, McDonnell was a committed Whig.

Chess career 

In 1825, he became a pupil of William Lewis, who was then the leading player in Britain. But soon, McDonnell had become so good that Lewis, fearing for his reputation, simply refused to play him anymore.

Around 1825–1826, McDonnell played Captain Evans, while the latter was on shore leave in London. McDonnell was beaten with what is now regarded in chess circles as the creation of the Evans Gambit (1.e4 e5 2.Nf3 Nc6 3.Bc4 Bc5 4.b4).

In 1831, along with George Walker, he became a founding member of the Westminster Chess Club and was acclaimed as England's best player.

La Bourdonnais matches 

At that time, the world's strongest player was the French aristocrat Louis-Charles Mahé de La Bourdonnais. Between June and October 1834, La Bourdonnais and McDonnell played a series of six matches, a total of eighty-five games, at the Westminster Chess Club in London. McDonnell won the second match, while La Bourdonnais won the first, third, fourth and fifth.  The sixth match was unfinished.

In the first game of the third match, McDonnell successfully introduced a new variation in the King's Gambit (1.e4 e5 2.f4 exf4 3.Nf3 g5 4.Bc4  g4 5.Nc3), known today as the McDonnell Gambit.

Death 
McDonnell was suffering from Bright's disease, a historical classification of nephritis, which affects the kidneys. In the summer of 1835, his condition worsened and he died in London on 15 September 1835 before his match with La Bourdonnais could be resumed.

When La Bourdonnais died penniless in 1840, George Walker arranged to have him buried in London's Kensal Green Cemetery, near where his old rival McDonnell is buried.

Notable games 
 Louis-Charles Mahé de La Bourdonnais vs. Alexander McDonnell, 04, London 1834, Queen's Gambit Accepted: Central Variation. McDonnell Defense (D20), 0–1 The first immortal game of the history of chess, according to Reuben Fine. A purely positional  sacrifice of a queen for two minor pieces.
 Louis-Charles Mahé de La Bourdonnais vs. Alexander McDonnell, London 1834, Bishop's Opening: Lopez Variation (C23), 0–1 An  interesting encounter with chances and errors on both sides, ending with a nice two-knights mate.
 McDonnell versus De La Bourdonnais, Match 4 (16), London 1834 A classic game demonstrating the power of a mobile central block of pawns.

Notes

References 

Bibliography

External links
 
 1834 Labourdonnais - McDonnell Matches match scores from Mark Weeks' chess pages
Edward Winter, Alexander McDonnell (2004)
 Chess and Chess-Players by George Walker

1798 births
1835 deaths
West Indies merchants
Irish chess players
Sportspeople from Belfast
Deaths from nephritis
Burials at Kensal Green Cemetery
19th-century chess players
19th-century British businesspeople